The Thames Valley Premier Football League is a football competition based in England. It has a total of five divisions – the Premier Division, then Divisions One to Four. It was founded in 1989 as the Reading Senior League, as a merger of the two leagues in the town – Reading & District League and the Reading Combination Leagues. The league ran 10 divisions in the 1989–90 season, but that has reduced over the years to the current five divisions.

The Premier Division sits at step 7 (or level 11) of the National League System. It is a feeder to the Combined Counties League and the Hellenic League.

The league changed its name to the current one for the start of the 2014-15 season.

2022–23 members

Premier Division (14 clubs)
Burghfield
Chalvey Sports 
Finchampstead
Maidenhead Town
Marlow United
Reading City U23
Reading YMCA
SB Phoenix
Slough Heating Laurencians
Wargrave
Westwood Wanderers
Windlesham United
Wraysbury Village
Yateley United

Division One (11 clubs)
AFC Winkfield | Goring United | Hambleden | Henley Town | Holyport Reserves | Hurst | Maidenhead Town Reserves | Tadley Calleva Reserves | Westwood Wanderers Reserves | Windlesham United Youth U23 | Woodley United Royals

Division Two (12 clubs)
Allied Community Elite | Berks County Swords | Burghfield Reserves | Cookham Dean | Hurst Reserves | Maidenhead Town 'A' | Mortimer Development | Pangbourne | Reading YMCA Rapids | SB Phoenix Reserves | Slough Heating Laurencians Reserves | Twyford & Ruscombe

Division Three (10 clubs)
AFC Winkfield Reserves | Binfield Development U23 | Farnham Royal Mavericks | Finchampstead Development | Goring United Reserves | Hambleden Stags | Henley Town Development | Marlow United Reserves | Reading City Development | Richings Park

Division Four (10 clubs)
AFC Corinthians | Berks County Rovers | Burghfield 'A' | Finchampstead United | Harchester Hawks | Pangbourne Development | Reading City U18 | SB Phoenix Development | Taplow United (Sat) Reserves | Wraysbury Village Development

Champions
1989–90 – West Reading
1990–91 – Forest Old Boys
1991–92 – Reading Exiles
1992–93 – Woodley Arms
1993–94 – Mortimer
1994–95 – Mortimer
1995–96 – Reading Exiles
1996–97 – Mortimer
1997–98 – Forest Old Boys
1998–99 – Forest Old Boys
1999–2000 – Forest Old Boys
2000–01 – Forest Old Boys
2001–02 – Mortimer
2002–03 – Forest Old Boys
2003–04 – Highmoor & Ibis
2004–05 – Marlow United
2005–06 – Cookham Dean
2006–07 – Ascot United
2007–08 – Westwood United
2008–09 – Woodley Town
2009–10 – Reading YMCA
2010–11 – Highmoor Ibis
2011–12 – South Reading
2012–13 – Reading YMCA
2013–14 – Highmoor & Ibis Reserves
2014–15 – Marlow United
2015–16 – Reading YMCA
2016–17 – Reading YMCA
2017–18 – Reading YMCA
2018–19 – Marlow United
2019–20 – season abandoned
2020–21 – Finchampstead
2021–22 – Finchampstead
2022–23 – Yateley United

References

External links
Full-Time at The FA
Official Site last updated at end of 2010-11 season
Berks and Bucks FA's Official Site. See for example the Berks and Bucks Junior Cup for SRCC's full name.

 
Football leagues in England
Sports leagues established in 1989
1989 establishments in England
Football in Berkshire
Sport in Reading, Berkshire